Cerithioclava garciai is a species of sea snail, a marine gastropod mollusk in the family Cerithiidae.

Distribution

Description 
The maximum recorded shell length is 92 mm.

Habitat 
Minimum recorded depth is 0 m. Maximum recorded depth is 24 m.

References

External links

Cerithiidae
Gastropods described in 1986